Chengdu Metro Line 27 is a Chengdu Metro line under construction in Chengdu, Sichuan, China. It is a tangential line that runs diagonally from the west to the north of Chengdu. The train uses 6 car B-type trains. Line 27's colour is light blue. 

In 2019, Aug 21st, the National Development and Reform Commission approved the 4th stage of development plan from Chengdu Rail Transit, which includes Line 27. 
 
The first phase will be from Xindu District Xiangcheng Avenue station to Qingyang District Heyuanmen Gate station. The line is 24.86km long with 23 stations. From the north, the line has a 7.52km long elevated section with 6 stations and followed by a 17.34km underground section with 17 stations. Phase 1 started construction on 2020-5-18 and is planned to open in by 2024.

Stations 

There are 7.52km that are on ground with 6 stations; and 17.34km underground tunnel with 17 stations. Phase 1 has 9 interchange stations

References 

Chengdu Metro lines
Transport infrastructure under construction in China